Coffman Memorial Union (commonly known as Coffman Union or simply Coffman) is a student union on the East Bank campus of the University of Minnesota in Minneapolis. Situated near the Mississippi River, Coffman anchors the south end of Northrop Mall, a grassy area at the center of campus that is bordered by the university's physics, mathematics, chemistry, and administration buildings, plus Walter Library. Northrop Auditorium sits at the north end of the mall, opposite Coffman across Washington Avenue.

History 
Coffman Memorial Union was built between 1939 and 1940 as a new "center of social life" for the University of Minnesota campus, a role that had previously been filled by Shevlin Hall and Nicholson Hall in the Old Campus Historic District. Designed by architect Clarence H. Johnston Jr, the new building opened in September 1940 and was dedicated on October 25th of the same year. It was named in memory of Lotus D. Coffman, President of the University of Minnesota between 1920 and 1938.

Since opening, the building has undergone two significant renovations. The first major renovation, completed in 1976, was widely criticized for its adverse effect on the building's exterior. However, this was largely corrected between 1999 and 2003 during the second major renovation. The second renovation restored the exterior, thoroughly renovated the interior, and greatly expanded the basement floors to include the main University of Minnesota Bookstore, food vendors, offices, lounges, and the glass "Cube" which sits adjacent to Washington Avenue. The project required the building to be closed for a period of three years.

In 2019, after 16 months of study, a University task force recommended removing Lotus Coffman's name from the building due to his racist and anti-Semitic policies.

Services and amenities 
The building hosts a variety of services including the University of Minnesota Bookstore, Minnesota Marketplace Food Court, US Postal Service, IT Student Lab, administration services, and student group services. While the main lounge and theater are located on the main floor of the building, the lower level offers access to the bookstore, Great Hall, and several dining options. The basement features the Whole Music Club and an entertainment center called Goldy's Gameroom (which also features a bowling alley). The building's upper floors are largely reserved for student and administration use, with student groups occupying much of the second floor. The fourth floor is home to the Campus Club, a member-based dining and event venue primarily used by faculty and alumni.

Organizations 
The building is home to the University of Minnesota Student Unions & Activities office, the Minnesota Student Association (the undergraduate student government organization), and the Graduate and Professional Student Assembly (the graduate student government organization). Other student groups located within the building include:
Al-Madinah Cultural Center
American Indian Student Cultural Center
Asian-American Student Union
Black Student Union
Disabled Student Cultural Center
La Raza Student Cultural Center
Minnesota International Student Association
Queer Student Cultural Center

Gallery

References

External links 
 Student Unions & Activities
 Coffman Union

Student activity centers in the United States
University of Minnesota
School buildings completed in 1940